Çelis Taflaj (born 12 March 1998) is an Albanian professional basketball player for the Italian side Viola Reggio Calabria in Serie A2, as well as the Albania national team. He previously played for KK Ulcinj.

References

1998 births
Living people
Albanian expatriate basketball people in Italy
Albanian men's basketball players
Basketball players from Shkodër
Albanian expatriate basketball people in Montenegro
Small forwards